List of England national rugby union players is a list of people who have played for the England national rugby union team. The list only includes players who have played in a Test match.

Note that the "position" column lists the position at which the player made his Test debut, not necessarily the position for which he is best known. For example, Jonny Wilkinson made his Test debut off the bench as a wing, but is more famous as a fly-half. A position in parentheses indicates that the player debuted as a substitute.

1871–1879

1880–1889

1890–1899

1900–1909

1910–1914

1920–1929

1930–1939

1947–1949

1950–1959

1960–1969

1970–1979

1980–1989

1990–1999

2000–2009

2010–2019

2020–present

References

 
England